Lepidochrysops pittawayi, the Pittaway's giant Cupid, is a butterfly in the family Lycaenidae. It is found in western Saudi Arabia. The habitat consists of high altitudes in the Asir Mountains. Colonies occur on steep slopes with patches of herbaceous Lamiaceae.

Adults have been recorded on wing in April.

The larvae feed on Micromeria species

References

Butterflies described in 1983
Lepidochrysops
Endemic fauna of Saudi Arabia